Cwmbran railway station was a station in the old village of Cwmbran in Torfaen (now known as Old Cwmbran) in South Wales, UK.

History
The station was opened on 11 March 1880 by the Great Western Railway as a replacement for the first Cwmbran station on the Monmouthshire Railway and Canal. This followed the Great Western's acquisition of the Monmouthshire Railway whose "Eastern Valley" line continued southward from Cwmbran Junction alongside the Monmouthshire Canal to Newport.

The station was on a line opened by the Great Western in 1878 to connect the Monmouthshire Railway with the Pontypool, Caerleon and Newport Railway at Llantarnam Junction. The Pontypool line, which opened in September 1874, had been built to relieve the congested Monmouthshire Railway and was absorbed by the Great Western in December 1874. 

The site adjacent to Victoria Street is now a car park and a doctor's surgery. The present Cwmbran railway station was opened in 1986 on the opposite side of the town centre on the Pontypool, Caerleon and Newport line, which remains open as part of the Welsh Marches Line.

References

Notes

Sources

External links
Pictures and local information
Station on a navigable 1947 O.S. map

Disused railway stations in Torfaen
Railway stations in Great Britain opened in 1880
Railway stations in Great Britain closed in 1962
Former Great Western Railway stations
Cwmbran